Carl or Karl Miller may refer to:
Carl Miller (basketball) (born 1966), British basketball player
Carl Miller (actor) (1893–1979), American film actor
Carl Miller (author), British author and speaker
Karl Miller (1931–2014), British writer
Karl Miller (footballer) (1913–1967), German international footballer
Carl Ferris Miller (1921–2002), American-born South Korean banker and arborist
K.W. Miller (full name Karl Walter Miller; born September 1965), energy analyst, and conspiracy theorist